The United Kingdom National Timing Centre is the proposed network of atomic clocks consisting of a central building, and a series of other locations across the UK.

The cost of the new system will cost £36 million,  but additionally the UK government has given £6.7 million through Innovate UK Funding and £40 million toward a new research program Quantum Technologies for fundamental physics to support UK research and investment.

Locations: University of Birmingham; University of Strathclyde; University of Surrey; BT Adastral Park, Suffolk; BBC, Manchester; National Physical Laboratory, Teddington.

History 
Discussions around a United Kingdom National Timing Centre began on 19 February 2020 as a response to the United Kingdom's over reliance on the European Union Global Navigation Satellite System (GNSS), and the  United States of America's (USA) GNSS Systems.

References

External links
National Timing Centre at the National Physical Laboratory

Standards organisations in the United Kingdom